Palmorchis is a genus of flowering plants from the orchid family, Orchidaceae. It is native to South America, Central America and Trinidad.

Palmorchis caxiuanensis Rocha, S.S.Almeida & Freitas - Pará
Palmorchis colombiana Garay - Colombia
Palmorchis deceptorius Veyret & Szlach. - Colombia
Palmorchis duckei Hoehne - Brazil
Palmorchis eidae Dressler - Costa Rica
Palmorchis guianensis (Schltr.) C.Schweinf. & Correll - Brazil, Venezuela, the Guianas
Palmorchis imuyaensis Dodson & G.A.Romero - Ecuador 
Palmorchis lobulata (Mansf.) C.Schweinf. & Correll - French Guiana, Ecuador, Peru
Palmorchis nitida Dressler - Costa Rica, Panama
Palmorchis pabstii Veyret - French Guiana
Palmorchis paludicola Dressler - Costa Rica
Palmorchis pandurata C.Schweinf. & Correll - Ecuador 
Palmorchis powellii (Ames) C.Schweinf. & Correll - Costa Rica, Panama
Palmorchis prospectorum Veyret - French Guiana, Suriname
Palmorchis puber (Cogn.) Garay - Brazil, Venezuela
Palmorchis pubescentis Barb.Rodr. - French Guiana, Suriname, Brazil, Venezuela, Trinidad
Palmorchis silvicola L.O.Williams - Costa Rica, Ecuador 
Palmorchis sobralioides Barb.Rodr.  - Ecuador, Brazil
Palmorchis sordida Dressler - Costa Rica
Palmorchis trilobulata L.O.Williams - Nicaragua, Costa Rica, Panama, Suriname, Ecuador
Palmorchis trinotata Dressler - Panama

See also 
 List of Orchidaceae genera

References 

 Berg Pana, H. 2005. Handbuch der Orchideen-Namen. Dictionary of Orchid Names. Dizionario dei nomi delle orchidee. Ulmer, Stuttgart

External links 

Neottieae
Neottieae genera